Béla Kuharszki (29 April 1940 – 7 March 2016) was a Hungarian footballer. He played for the club Újpesti Dózsa as a striker. He played six games for the Hungary national football team.

Kuharszki played one qualifying game and was part of the squad for the 1962 FIFA World Cup.

References

1940 births
2016 deaths
Place of death missing
Újpest FC players
1962 FIFA World Cup players
Hungary international footballers
Association football forwards
Hungarian footballers